Cali Chronic, also known by its edited title Cali, is the second and final single released by rap group, Harlem World. The single version of this song was different from the album version as the single version featured a verse from Snoop Dogg, but both were produced by D-Dot. it contains a sample of Funky Worm performed by The Ohio Players. "Cali Chronic" was not much of a success, only making it to #87 on the Hot R&B/Hip-Hop Singles & Tracks chart.

Single track listing

A-Side
"Cali Chronic" (LBC Mix)   
"Cali Chronic" (LBC Mix Squeaky Clean)   
"Cali Chronic" (LP Instrumental)

B-Side
"Not The Kids" (LP Version Dirty)   
"Not The Kids" (LP Version Clean)   
"Cali Chronic" (Clean LP Version)

Chart performance

Notes 

1999 singles
Snoop Dogg songs
So So Def Recordings singles
1999 songs